The kani bushfrog (Pseudophilautus kani) is a small shrub frog species of the genus Pseudophilautus and it's found in southern districts of kerala(thiruvananthapuram,kollam and possibly adjacent districts) and tamil nadu.

References 

Amphibians described in 2009
kani